Eugene Butler (1849 – October 22, 1913) was an American serial killer who murdered six teenage boys at his residence in Niagara, North Dakota from 1900 to 1906. He was then admitted to an asylum, where he died in 1913, two years before his crimes were discovered.

Biography

Early life and move to North Dakota
Butler was born in 1849, one of three sons born to Ephraim and Rebecca (née Pearson) Butler. He was of English descent, with his family having roots in Braintree, Essex, England. He came from a prosperous family, and around 1882, he moved to North Dakota from Buffalo, New York, buying a 480-acre farm in Niagara, North Dakota. He maintained it on his own, never married and lived as a recluse, avoiding contacts with neighbors and only going out for business purposes in nearby Larimore, North Dakota, hiring farm hands to maintain his farm during the summer months.

Insanity, asylum and death
Ever since moving to the state, Butler began showing signs of a mental illness, including suffering from hallucinations and thinking that invisible people were chasing him. His mind deteriorated even further around 1906, when he began riding out into the night, screaming at the top of his lungs and scaring the county's residents. Due to being considered a public nuisance, he was admitted to the North Dakota State Hospital under the supervision of Dr. W. M. Hotchkiss.

During the following years at the asylum, Butler only gave some trouble at isolated periods to the staff, most of the time just expressing his fears towards invisible figures that were "chasing after" him and having his picture taken, believing that the camera would suck out his soul. Aside from this, he showed no homicidal tendencies at all. According to Dr. A. W. Guest, Butler was a man of small stature, very gallant and fond of attending the hospital dances, even falling desperately in love with one of the female physicians. On October 22, 1913, Butler died while imprisoned in the asylum. His remains were shipped to Middleport, New York, where he would be buried by relatives.

Discovery of murders
After Butler's death, the estate was divided between his living relatives with the help of attorney W. E. Houpt. In 1915, workmen were sent to excavate the property with the purpose of renovating it. One of these workmen, named Leo Verbulehn, was digging a cellar under the house when he discovered the skeletons. All of them had had their skulls crushed, most likely by a sharp instrument, and at least two had had their legs broken. Initially, there was a theory that five of the remains belonged to a family consisting of two women, probably housekeepers, and their children. Nobody in the neighborhood, however, ever recalled a family that had ever gone missing in the county. The possibility of the family's being Butler's relatives was also ruled out, as he must have murdered them immediately upon entering his premises.

Later, police revealed that all the skeletons belonged to young men, one of them being a boy aged between 15 and 18 and another who had a crooked nose. Authorities could not identify the individuals and suggested that they were vagrants employed as farmhands by Butler, which would explain why nobody had noted their disappearances. It is suspected that he had probably murdered the men because he thought they were going to steal money from his house, a lot of which he had lying about. It was also noted that there were no traces of clothes of any kind, suggesting that the bodies had been buried nude and that Butler had burned the clothes.

In order to dispose of the bodies, Butler had built a trap door, removing three bottom stones from the house foundation. He then had used black dirt and red clay subsoil in order to cover up the burial place of the bodies.

Following the grisly discovery, many onlookers visited the farm in order to observe the crime scene. The deputies deposited the victims' aging bones in a box, which was then transported to the office of Sheriff Art Turner. Later, it was discovered that some of the bones were stolen, most likely by souvenir hunters.

John Urbanski inquiry
A possible lead to the identification of at least one of the victims was the inquiry of Leo Urbanski, a wealthy farmer residing in Long Prairie, Minnesota. At his request, attorney C. B. DeLaurier wrote to the state attorney O. B. Burtness, claiming that one of the victims might be his brother, John Urbanski. John, who also went by the name John Miller, was a young man who disappeared near Niagara in 1902. Before his sudden vanishing, he had written a letter to his brother, stating that he was working for a bachelor in the city. The letter's post mark indicated it had been mailed from Larimore, the town where Butler conducted business.

Solving the mystery
To this day, Butler's victims remain unidentified. According to forensic anthropologist Dr. Phoebe Stubblefield, modern DNA techniques could be used to identify the remains if they are discovered by authorities or surrendered by those who stole them.

In 2016, the Grand Forks County Sheriff's Department reached out to the public in an effort to find new leads, as the old case records were either destroyed or lost.

See also 
 List of serial killers in the United States

References

1849 births
1913 deaths
1900s murders in the United States
19th-century American criminals
20th-century American criminals
American murderers of children
American people of English descent
American serial killers
Criminals from New York (state)
Male serial killers
People from Royalton, New York
Unidentified murder victims in the United States
Violence against men in North America